Marantz is an audio equipment company.

Marantz may also refer to:

People
Alec Marantz, linguist
Andrew Marantz, author and journalist
Paul Marantz, lighting designer
Robin Marantz Henig, writer
Saul Marantz, an American musician and engineer

See also
Maran (disambiguation)
Marand, a city in Iran
Marans, a breed of chicken
Marans, Charente-Maritime